A total of at least five special routes of U.S. Route 322 currently exist.

State College business route

U.S. Route 322 Business is a 9-mile route following the original alignment of its parent. After the mainline of the route was shifted on to the Mount Nittany Expressway (whose western portion is now also part of Interstate 99), the business designation came into place. The entire route is known as Atherton Street, which begins in the west as a four-lane road that is mostly bordered by residential development. After passing by the southern entrance to Penn State University, the highway narrows to two lanes through the town center. West of downtown, the route is four lanes and offers a mix of periodic commercial development and more rural scenes.

Downingtown alternate truck route

U.S. Route 322 Alternate Truck (US 322 Alt. Truck) is a truck route of US 322 around a weight-restricted bridge over the East Branch Brandywine Creek in Downingtown, Pennsylvania, on which trucks over 36 tons and combination loads over 40 tons are prohibited. The route follows the US 30 freeway, PA 113, and US 30 Bus./US 322 Truck. US 322 Alt. Truck runs concurrent with US 30 Bus. Alt. Truck along US 30 and PA 113.

Downingtown truck route

U.S. Route 322 Truck is a 4-mile route bypass of Downingtown, Pennsylvania that provides a route for trucks around a low clearance underpass. The route travels east from the mainline along U.S. Route 30 Business (Lancaster Avenue), which is lined with shopping centers. It then turns south onto Quarry Road near an interchange with U.S. Route 30, and travels west past industrial development on Boot Road.

Major intersections

West Chester business route

U.S. Route 322 Business (US 322 Bus.) is a business route of US 322 in the borough and surrounding townships of West Chester in Chester County, Pennsylvania. US 322 bypasses West Chester to the north and east on the West Chester Bypass while US 322 Bus. heads through the downtown area. The business route begins at US 322 northwest of the borough and heads southeast, entering West Chester on Hannum Avenue. US 322 Bus. heads east into downtown West Chester along the one-way pair of West Market and West Chestnut streets. In the center of town, the route heads south along South High Street, passing through the West Chester University of Pennsylvania campus as it leaves the borough. US 322 Bus. comes to its eastern terminus at an interchange with US 202/US 322 at the southern terminus of the bypass.

In the 1920s, the current routing of US 322 Bus. was designated PA 5 heading northwest of West Chester and US 122/PA 29 (later US 202) along High Street. In the 1930s, US 322 was designated to run through the borough along Hannum Avenue, Gay Street, and High Street, replacing PA 5 and running concurrent with US 202. US 322 was moved to a bypass of West Chester in the 1950s, and US 322 Bus. was assigned to the former alignment of the route through the borough. US 202 was moved to the bypass by 1970, eliminating the concurrency it had with US 322 Bus. The concurrent PA 100 designation along High Street between downtown and PA 52 was removed in 2003.

Mullica Hill business route

U.S. Route 322 Business (US 322 Bus.) is a  business route following the former alignment of US 322 through the community of Mullica Hill in Harrison Township, Gloucester County, New Jersey. The route begins at an intersection with US 322/CR 536/CR 536A and Route 45 north of Mullica Hill, heading south concurrent with Route 45/CR 536 on two-lane undivided Main Street. The road passes homes and some businesses in the community. In the center of Mullica Hill, US 322 Bus./CR 536 splits from Route 45 by heading east on Mullica Road and then turns right onto Mullica Hill Road. The route continues through a mix of woods, fields, and residential subdivisions. US 322 Bus. reaches its eastern terminus at an intersection with US 322/CR 536A and CR 623, at which point Mullica Hill Road continues east as US 322/CR 536. US 322 Bus. is county-maintained its entire length and is unsigned. US 322 Bus. was created following the rerouting of US 322 onto the Mullica Hill Bypass in 2012.

Major intersections

References

22-3
 
22-3
22-3